Bangitappal (Cannabis tableland), is a valley in the southwest end of Mukurthi National Park located at: , elevation:  at the confluence of two streams at the head of the Sispara Pass in the Western Ghats in Tamil Nadu South India. A forest rest house and a trekkers shed built there in 1930 are now used by park staff and visiting researchers. 

A rough  jeep road leads there from the Upper Bhavani Dam.
This valley also contains a dam made from dirt.

Notes 

Protected areas of Tamil Nadu